Trigoso (earlier, Tregoso) is a frazione in the comune of Sestri Levante, Metropolitan City of Genoa, Liguria, Italy. It was the site of the ancient city of Tigullia, which belonged to the Ligurian tribe named Tigullii, and noted by Pliny the Elder. It is probable, also, that the Tegulata of the Antonine Itineraries is identical with the Tigullia of Pliny.

References

Frazioni of the Province of Genoa
Roman towns and cities in Italy